The New Zealand Thoroughbred Breeders Stakes a Group One horse race for fillies and mares held in April each year.  It is run under weight for age conditions for fillies and mares.

The first edition of the race was held at Te Aroha on 27 February 1971 when Breathalyser, a three-year-old filly by Battle-Waggon won from Ajasco and Devante. The race attained Group Two status in 1979 and was elevated to Group One in 2002.  The 50th edition of the race was held in 2021.

Recent results

Previous winners

 2012 Say No More
 2011 Barinka
 2010 Juice
 2009 Dane Julia
 2008 Special Mission 
 2007 Captivate
 2006 Arlingtonboulevard
 2005 Rockabubble
 2004 Surprize Surprize
 2003 Zirna
 2002 Saintne Cecile
 2001 Saint Cecile
 2000 Tall Poppy
 1999 Aimee Jay
 1998 Aimee Jay
 1991 Waikiki
 1990 Waikiki
 1987 Trocane
 1986 Dare
 1979 Orchidra
 1977 Tudor Light
 1976 Tudor Light 
 1971 Breathalyser

See also 

 New Zealand Oaks
 New Zealand 2000 Guineas
 Thoroughbred racing in New Zealand

References

Horse races in New Zealand